The 2011–12 Scottish Youth Cup was the 29th season of the Scottish Youth Cup, Scotland's national cup tournament at under-19 age level. The competition is administered by the Scottish Football Association and is open to all Senior clubs.

Celtic won the tournament for a third successive season after defeating Queen of the South by a record 8–0 margin in the final.

Calendar
The ties for the 2011–12 competition are scheduled as below:

Format
First Round - 37 teams are divided by geographical area. 21 teams go into the Central Group, 10 into the North Group and 6 into the South Group.The required number of ties are drawn to reduce the number of teams in the Second Round to 32. The rest of teams receive byes into the Second Round.
Second Round - 5 winners from the First Round join 27 teams, who received byes in the previous round.
Third Round - 16 winners from the Second Round join the 16 seeded teams, who enter at this stage by virtue of having reached the Fourth Round of last years competition.
Fourth Round - 16 winners from the Third Round.
Quarter-finals - 8 winners from the Fourth Round.
Semi-finals - 4 winners of the Quarter-finals.
Final - 2 winners of the Semi-finals.

Fixtures & Results
The draws for the First and Second Rounds were conducted on 22 July 2011.

First round

Central Group
Alloa Athletic, Berwick Rangers, Brechin City, Cowdenbeath, Dundee, Dundee United, East Fife, East Stirlingshire, Edinburgh City, Forfar Athletic, Greenock Morton, Motherwell, Queen's Park, St Johnstone and Stirling Albion receive byes into the Second Round.

Source: http://news.bbc.co.uk/sport2/hi/football/scot_cups/default.stm

North Group
Clachnacuddin, Cove Rangers, Fort William, Fraserburgh, Peterhead and Ross County receive byes into the Second Round.

Source: http://news.bbc.co.uk/sport2/hi/football/scot_cups/default.stm

South Group
No First Round ties were drawn in this group.Annan Athletic, Gala Fairydean, Kilmarnock, Queen of the South, St Cuthbert Wanderers and Stranraer receive byes into the Second Round.

Second round

Central Group
Source: http://news.bbc.co.uk/sport2/hi/football/scot_cups/default.stm

North Group
Source: http://news.bbc.co.uk/sport2/hi/football/scot_cups/default.stm

South Group
Source: http://news.bbc.co.uk/sport2/hi/football/scot_cups/default.stm

Third round
Seeded clubs for the Third Round are Aberdeen, Airdrie United, Ayr United, Celtic, Clyde, Coldstream, Falkirk, Hamilton Academical, Heart of Midlothian, Hibernian, Livingston, Montrose, Raith Rovers, Rangers, St Mirren and Stenhousemuir.

The Third Round draw was made by Stewart Regan on 18 October 2011.

Fourth round
The Fourth round draw was conducted on 16 November 2011.

Quarter-finals
The draw for the Quarter-finals was made on 12 December 2011.

Semi-finals
The draw for the Semi-finals took place at Hampden Park on 15 February 2012.

Final

External links
 Official site

References

5
Scottish Youth Cup seasons